Gary Fischer may refer to:

Gary Fischer, character in British/American TV series Intruders
Gary Fischer, better known as Henchman 21, character in American TV series The Venture Bros.

See also
Gary Fisher, cyclist and bicycle maker
Gary Fisher (footballer), British footballer